Saint Columba (521–597) was an Irish Christian saint who evangelized Scotland.

Saint Columba may also refer to:

Saints
 Columba of Cornwall or Saint Columba the Virgin
 Columba of Sens
 Columba of Spain
 Columba of Terryglass

Schools
 St. Columba's College, Hazaribagh, India
 St Columba's College, Dublin, a co-educational boarding school affiliated with the Church of Ireland in Dublin, Ireland
 St Columba's College, Essendon, an all-female Catholic secondary school in Melbourne, Australia
 St Columba's College, St Albans, a Catholic independent boys' school in St Albans, England
 St. Columba's High School (disambiguation), multiple schools
 St Columba's Roman Catholic High School, Dunfermline in Scotland
 St. Columba's School, Delhi, India
 St Columba's School, Kilmacolm, Scotland
 St Columba's High School, Gourock, Scotland

Other
 Cathach of St. Columba, an early seventh-century Irish Psalter
 Knights of St Columba, a Scottish Order of Catholic Laymen
 Urney St. Columba's GAC, a Gaelic Athletic Association club in County Tyrone, Northern Ireland
 St. Kolumba, Cologne, a destroyed church in Cologne, Germany, now chapel
 MS Masarrah, a ferry originally named St. Columba, working on the Irish sea
 St. Columba (tune), traditional Irish tune

See also
 Columba (disambiguation)
 Columbanus (540–615), also known as St. Columban, was an Irish missionary
 Santa Coloma (disambiguation)
 St Columb (disambiguation)
 St. Columba's Church (disambiguation)